Somatization disorder is a mental and behavioral disorder characterized by recurring, multiple, and current, clinically significant complaints about somatic symptoms. It was recognized in the DSM-IV-TR classification system, but in the latest version DSM-5, it was combined with undifferentiated somatoform disorder to become somatic symptom disorder, a diagnosis which no longer requires a specific number of somatic symptoms. ICD-10, the latest version of the International Statistical Classification of Diseases and Related Health Problems, still includes somatization syndrome.

Criteria

DSM-5
In the DSM-5 the disorder has been renamed somatic symptom disorder (SSD), and includes SSD with predominantly somatic complaints (previously referred to as somatization disorder), and SSD with pain features (previously known as pain disorder).

DSM-IV-TR
The DSM-IV-TR diagnostic criteria are:
 A history of somatic complaints over several years, starting prior to the age of 30.
 Such symptoms cannot be fully explained by a general medical condition or substance use or, when there is an associated medical condition, the impairments due to the somatic symptoms are more severe than generally expected.
 Complaints are not feigned as in malingering or factitious disorder.
The symptoms do not all have to occur at the same time, but may occur over the course of the disorder. A somatization disorder itself is chronic but fluctuating that rarely remits completely. A thorough physical examination of the specified areas of complaint is critical for somatization disorder diagnosis. Medical examination would provide objective evidence of subjective complaints of the individual.

Diagnosis of somatization disorder is difficult because it is hard to determine to what degree psychological factors are exacerbating subjective feelings of pain. For instance, chronic pain is common in 30% of the U.S. population, making it difficult to determine whether or not the pain is due to predominantly psychological factors.

ICD-10
In ICD-10, the latest version of the International Statistical Classification of Diseases and Related Health Problems, somatization syndrome is described as:

ICD-10 also includes the following subgroups of somatization syndrome:
 Undifferentiated somatoform disorder.
 Hypochondriasis.
 Somatoform autonomic dysfunction.
 Persistent somatoform pain disorder.
 Other somatoform disorders, such ones predominated by dysmenorrhoea, dysphagia, pruritus and torticollis.
 Somatoform disorder, unspecified.

Cause
Although somatization disorder has been studied and diagnosed for more than a century, there is debate and uncertainty regarding its pathophysiology. Most current explanations focus on the concept of a misconnection between the mind and the body. Genetics probably contributes a very small amount to development of the disorder.

One of the oldest explanations for somatization disorder advances the theory that it is a result of the body's attempt to cope with emotional and psychological stress. The theory states that the body has a finite capacity to cope with psychological, emotional, and social distress, and that beyond a certain point symptoms are experienced as physical, principally affecting the digestive, nervous, and reproductive systems. There are many different feedback systems where the mind affects the body; for instance, headaches are known to be associated with psychological factors, and stress and the hormone cortisol are known to have a negative impact on immune functions. This might explain why somatization disorders are more likely in people with irritable bowel syndrome, and why patients with SSD are more likely to have a mood or anxiety disorder. There is also a much increased incidence of SSD in people with a history of physical, emotional or sexual abuse.

Another hypothesis for the cause of somatization disorder is that people with the disorder have heightened sensitivity to internal physical sensations and pain.  A biological sensitivity to somatic feelings could predispose a person to developing SSD. It is also possible that a person's body might develop increased sensitivity of nerves associated with pain and those responsible for pain perception, as a result of chronic exposure to stressors.

Cognitive theories explain somatization disorder as arising from negative, distorted, and catastrophic thoughts and reinforcement of these cognitions. Catastrophic thinking could lead a person to believe that slight ailments, such as mild muscle pain or shortness of breath, are evidence of a serious illness such as cancer or a tumor. These thoughts can then be reinforced by supportive social connections. A spouse who responds more to his or her partner's pain cues makes it more likely that he or she will express greater pain. Children of parents who are preoccupied or overly attentive to the somatic complaints of their children are more likely to develop somatic symptoms. Severe cognitive distortions can make a person with SSD limit the behaviors he or she engages in, and cause increased disability and impaired functioning.

Neuroimaging evidence
Some literature reviews of cognitive–affective neuroscience on somatization disorder suggested that catastrophization in patients with somatization disorders tends to present a greater vulnerability to pain. The relevant brain regions include the dorsolateral prefrontal, insular, rostral anterior cingulate, premotor, and parietal cortices.

Treatments
To date, cognitive behavioral therapy (CBT) is the best established treatment for a variety of somatoform disorders including somatization disorder. CBT aims to help patients realize their ailments are not catastrophic and to enable them to gradually return to activities they previously engaged in, without fear of "worsening their symptoms". Consultation and collaboration with the primary care physician also demonstrated some effectiveness. The use of antidepressants is preliminary but does not yet show conclusive evidence. Electroconvulsive shock therapy (ECT) has been used in treating somatization disorder among the elderly; however, the results were still debatable with some concerns around the side effects of using ECT. Overall, psychologists recommend addressing a common difficulty in patients with somatization disorder in the reading of their own emotions.  This may be a central feature of treatment; as well as developing a close collaboration between the GP, the patient and the mental health practitioner.

Epidemiology
Somatization disorder is estimated to occur in 0.2% to 2% of females, and 0.2% of males.

There are cultural differences in the prevalence of somatization disorder. For example, somatization disorder and symptoms were found to be significantly more common in Puerto Rico. In addition the diagnosis is also more prevalent among African Americans and those with less than a high school education or lower socioeconomic status.

There is usually co-morbidity with other psychological disorders, particularly mood disorders or anxiety disorders. Research also showed comorbidity between somatization disorder and personality disorders, especially antisocial, borderline, narcissistic, histrionic, avoidant, and dependent personality disorder.

About 10-20 percent of female first degree relatives also have somatization disorder and male relatives have increased rates of alcoholism and sociopathy.

See also

 Body-centred countertransference
 Culture-bound syndrome
 Hypochondriasis
 Medically unexplained symptoms
 Psychosomatic illness
 Munchausen syndrome

References

External links 

Somatic symptom disorders

de:Somatoforme Störung
is:Geðvefrænir sjúkdómar
fi:Somatisaatiohäiriö